Keuka may refer to:

Keuka Lake
Keuka College
Keuka (brand)